Bonchurch Landslips is a  site of special scientific interest which is located north-east of Ventnor, Isle of Wight. A wooded coastal landslip zone, the site was notified in 1977 for both its biological and geological features.

Part of the Isle of Wight Undercliff, it is accessed by several footpaths, including V65C, that descends into the landslip via the Devil's Chimney rock cleft; V65, descending via another rock chimney called 'The Chink'; V65b from Ventnor; and V65a from Luccombe.

Significance
The Bonchurch Landslip (also called East End Landslip) involves a coastal Cretaceous sequence where harder Upper Greensand rocks overlie softer Gault clay. It has SSSI status for its geomorphological interest (the Undercliff itself, and the landslips and mud flows below) and its botanical assemblage. The Gault clay supports established woodland of ash, oak and beech, with unusual lichen species. The lower slips, comprising mixed clay and sandy habitats, support a complex mix of acid-loving and chalk-loving plant species.

History
The Landslip is believed to have existed for thousands of years, but its present terrain derives largely from major landslide events in 1810 and 1818. An 1811 account by Thomas Webster described the scene:

I was surprised at the scene of devastation, which seemed to have been occasioned by some convulsion of nature. A considerable portion of the cliff had fallen down, strewing the whole of the ground between it and the sea with its ruins ; huge masses of solid rock started up amidst heaps of smaller fragments, whilst immense quantities of loose marl, mixed with stones, and even the soil above with the wheat still growing on it, filled up the spaces between, and formed hills of rubbish which are scarcely accessible.

Nothing had resisted the force of the falling rocks. Trees were levelled with the ground ; and many lay half buried in the ruins. The streams were choked up, and pools of water were formed in many places. Whatever road or path formerly existed through this place had been effaced ; and with some difficulty I passed over this avalanche which extended many hundred yards.

The Bonchurch Landslip was developed as a picturesque woodland walk in Victorian times, with natural features including the Devil's Chimney, the Chink, and the Wishing Seat (a.k.a. Wishing Stone, a large moss-covered rock by the path).

A lesser slip took place in February 1995. Although Bonchurch village itself is on a stable part of the Undercliff, slippage is still active at its edge adjacent to The Bonchurch Landslip: in 2011, subsidence destroyed North Court, a Victorian villa.

Cultural references
The 1847 religious story The Old Man's Home by William Adams features a description of the East End landslip in the 1840s after its vegetation was re-established.

References

Sites of Special Scientific Interest on the Isle of Wight
Ventnor